The range of area codes 200–299 in Mexico is reserved for Puebla, Tlaxcala, Oaxaca and Veracruz.

(For other areas, see Area codes in Mexico by code).

2